Fravashi Academy is a pre-primary, primary and secondary school run by the R. S. Luth Education Trust in Nashik City, Maharashtra, India. It also has a junior college. Mr. Ratanshaw Sorabji Luth, after whom the trust is named was also the founder father of Fravashi Academy. He formed the educational trust in 1978. Fravashi Academy was started in 1982.

The name Fravashi, is the Avestan for the Zoroastrian theory of a personal spirit of an individual.

The Chairman of the trust is Mr. Ratan Luth. Mrs. C. C. de Rozario acts as the managing director and Mrs. Sudha Murali heads the school as the principal. Mrs. Rashida Vasi supervises the primary section & Mrs. Neha Meghrajani is the supervisor of the pre-primary section. Fravashi Academy is the first school in North Maharashtra to get the ISO: 9001 – 2008 certification for its quality management systems. The school prepares the students to appear for the grade X ICSE examinations conducted by the Indian Certificate of Secondary Education.

Campus
The school is divided into several blocks - the administrative block which comprises the fees counter, transport department, the Chairman's office, the pre-primary paradise which exclusively caters to the age group of three to five years, the primary section building catering to the students of Std I to Std IV, the secondary section building comprises classes from Std 5 to Std 10, the junior college floor is exclusive to Std XI & XII, the ICSE Examination Hall and activity and open spaces.  The campus has lush green lawns with a play ground, a skating rink, area for outdoor games and gymnastics, malakhamb. The respective blocks also are well equipped with chemistry, biology and physics laboratories, audio visual rooms, language labs, state of art library, computer labs, etc.

Notable alumni
Sayali Bhagat, actor
Shashank Khaitan, director
Shaunak Chafekar, entrepreneur
Vidit Gujrathi, chess grandmaster
Saiyami Kher, actor

References
fravashiacademy.com (Official website of the school)

ratanluth.com

https://www.icbse.com/schools/fravashi-academy-l8pw9o

Schools in Nashik
Private schools in Maharashtra